Ginny Purdy won in the final 6–2, 7–5 against Cláudia Monteiro.

Seeds
A champion seed is indicated in bold text while text in italics indicates the round in which that seed was eliminated.

  Susan Mascarin (second round)
  Candy Reynolds (quarterfinals)
  Lucia Romanov (first round)
  Betsy Nagelsen (semifinals)
  Nancy Yeargin (first round)
  Patricia Medrado (first round)
  Vicki Nelson (first round)
  Jennifer Mundel (second round)

Draw

External links
 1983 Pittsburgh Open Draw

Singles